The Kan river is a right tributary of the Yenisey in Krasnoyarsk Krai, Siberia, Russia. Its valley forms the southern boundary of the Yenisey Range.

Course

See also
List of rivers of Russia

References

Notes
 Material translated from the Russian Wikipedia article.

Rivers of Krasnoyarsk Krai